Hungary–Palestine relations were formalized when Hungary recognized the Palestine as a sovereign state on 23 November 1988. Palestine has an embassy in Budapest.

History 
In 1975, the PLO opened an office in Budapest. In 2011, the Palestinian President visited Hungary at the invitation of President Pál Schmitt.

References

External links
 Embassy of Palestine in Hungary 

Palestine
Hungary